The men's double-shot 100 meter running deer competition was one of 15 shooting sports events on the Shooting at the 1908 Summer Olympics programme. The runs lasted about 4 seconds each and took place  distant from the shooter. There were three concentric circles on the target, with the smallest counting for 4 points, the middle for 3, and the outermost for 2. A hit outside the circles but still on the target (except on the haunch) counted for 1 point. The maximum possible score was thus 80 points. Each nation could enter up to 12 shooters.

Results

References

Sources
 
 

Men's rifle running deer 02
100 meter running deer at the Olympics